Anolis longiceps, the Navassa anole, is a species of lizard in the family Dactyloidae. The species is found on Navassa Island.

References

Anoles
Reptiles described in 1919
Taxa named by Karl Patterson Schmidt